Dinhard is a municipality in the district of Winterthur, which is located in the canton of Zürich in Switzerland.

History

Dinhard is first mentioned in 1275 as Thynart.

Geography
Of this area, 70.1% is used for agricultural purposes, while 19.5% is forested. Of the rest of the land, 10% is settled (buildings or roads) and the remainder (0.4%) is non-productive (rivers, glaciers or mountains).   housing and buildings made up 6.2% of the total area, while transportation infrastructure made up the rest (3.9%). Of the total unproductive area, water (streams and lakes) made up 0.4% of the area.   6.3% of the total municipal area was undergoing some type of construction.

The municipality is located in the southern Zürcher Weinland.  It consists of the villages of  Kirch- and Ausser-Dinhard, Welsikon, Eschlikon and Vorder Grüt.

Demographics
, 6.5% of the population was made up of foreign nationals.   the gender distribution of the population was 51.3% male and 48.7% female. Over the last 10 years the population has grown at a rate of 7.6%. Most of the population speaks German  (97.3%), with English being second most common ( 0.7%) and Italian being third ( 0.5%).

In the 2007 election the most popular party was the SVP which received 46% of the vote.  The next three most popular parties were the CSP (11.3%), the FDP (10.9%) and the Green Party (10.2%).

The age distribution of the population is children and teenagers (0–19 years old) make up 27.2% of the population, while adults (20–64 years old) make up 63.6% and seniors (over 64 years old) make up 9.2%.  The entire Swiss population is generally well educated.  In Dinhard about 86.1% of the population (between age 25-64) have completed either non-mandatory upper secondary education or additional higher education (either university or a Fachhochschule).  There are 500 households in Dinhard.

Dinhard has an unemployment rate of 1.07%.  , there were 92 people employed in the primary economic sector and about 30 businesses involved in this sector.  128 people are employed in the secondary sector and there are 20 businesses in this sector.  130 people are employed in the tertiary sector, with 38 businesses in this sector.   39.4% of the working population were employed full-time, and 60.6% were employed part-time.

 there were 220 Catholics and 912 Protestants in Dinhard. In the 2000 census, religion was broken down into several smaller categories. Of the rest of the population, 0% were Muslim, 1.5% belonged to another religion (not listed), 2.5% did not give a religion, and 9.3% were atheist or agnostic.

The historical population is given in the following table:

Transport 
Dinhard railway station is  served by Zurich S-Bahn line S29, which links Winterthur and Stein am Rhein.

References

External links

Official website 

Municipalities of the canton of Zürich